Mnesiloba is a genus of moth in the family Geometridae.

Species
Mnesiloba cauditornata (Prout, 1931)
Mnesiloba dentifascia (Hampson, 1891)
Mnesiloba eupitheciata (Walker, 1863)
Mnesiloba intentata (Walker, 1866)

References

External links
Natural History Museum Lepidoptera genus database

Eupitheciini